The 1924 United States Senate election in New Jersey was held on November 4, 1924. Incumbent Republican Senator Walter Evans Edge was re-elected to a second term in office. He would not complete the term, resigning from office in 1929 to be sworn in as the U.S. Ambassador to France.

Republican primary

Candidates
Walter Evans Edge, incumbent Senator since 1919
Hamilton Fish Kean, Republican National Committeeman and brother of former Senator John Kean

Declined
Joseph S. Frelinghuysen Sr., former U.S. Senator (1917–23) (to run in 1928)

Campaign
Edge ran as a decided "wet," or opponent of Prohibition, while Kean was supported by the Anti-Saloon League. Kean also accused Edge of disloyalty to President Calvin Coolidge.

Results
Edge defeated Kean by a large plurality.

Democratic primary

Candidates
Frederick W. Donnelly, Mayor of Trenton

Results
Donnelly was unopposed for the Democratic nomination.

General election

Candidates
John C. Butterworth (Socialist Labor)
Grafton E. Day (Prohibition)
Frederick W. Donnelly (Democrat), Mayor of Trenton
Walter Evans Edge (Republican), incumbent Senator
Herman G. Loew (Commonwealth Land)
George L. Record (Progressive), perennial candidate
Rudolf Vollgraf (Workers)

Results

See also 
1924 United States Senate elections

References

New Jersey
1924
1924 New Jersey elections